Macrocytosis is the enlargement of red blood cells with near-constant hemoglobin concentration, and is defined by a mean corpuscular volume (MCV) of greater than 100 femtolitres (the precise criterion varies between laboratories). The enlarged erythrocytes are called macrocytes or megalocytes (both words have roots meaning "big cell"). As a symptom its cause may be relatively benign and need no treatment or it may indicate a serious underlying illness.

Causes 
In humans, most commonly (especially when the increase in size is mild, and just above normal range) the cause is bone marrow dysplasia secondary to alcohol use disorder.

Poor absorption of vitamin B12 in the digestive tract can also cause macrocytosis.

Gastrointestinal diseases that may cause macrocytosis include celiac disease (severe sensitivity to gluten from wheat and other grains that causes intestinal damage) and Crohn's disease (inflammatory bowel disease that can affect any part of the gastrointestinal tract).

Other causes may include:

 megaloblastosis (vitamin B12 or folate deficiency) because slowly dividing erythrocytes accumulate cytoplasmic components, resulting in larger-than-normal cells.
 hypothyroidism
 chronic obstructive pulmonary disease (COPD)
 aplastic anemia
 reticulocytosis (commonly from hemolysis or a recent history of blood loss).
 liver disease because of an increase in circulating phospholipids and cholesterol, which bind on erythrocytes and induce membrane expansion
 myeloproliferative disease
 myelodysplastic syndrome which most commonly presents with macrocytic anemia
 chronic exposure to benzene
 pregnancy (most common, and requires no treatment as the person affected will return to normal post-partum)
 Certain anti-inflammatory drugs, e.g. salazopyrin, azathioprine.

Complications 
No complications arise from macrocytosis itself and a prognosis will be determined from its cause.

See also
 Macrocytic anemia

References

External links 

Hematopathology
Abnormal clinical and laboratory findings for RBCs